Orsha is a city in Vitebsk Region, Belarus, on the fork of the Dnieper and Arshytsa rivers. It serves as the administrative center of Orsha District.

History

Orsha was first mentioned in 1067 as Rsha,  making it one of the oldest towns in Belarus. The town was named after the river, which was originally also named Rsha, probably from a Baltic root *rus 'slowly flowing.'

In 1320, Orsha became a part of the Grand Duchy of Lithuania. Between 1398–1407, the Orsha castle was built. On 8 September 1514 the famous Battle of Orsha occurred, between allied Grand Duchy of Lithuania with Kingdom of Poland and Muscovite army. The Muscovites suffered significant defeat; however, the victorious Grand Duchy of Lithuania did not fully avail its victory.

In 1555, Mikołaj "the Black" Radziwiłł founded a Calvinist (Protestant) order in Orsha, one of the first in the Belarusian lands. From the sixteenth to eighteenth centuries Orsha was a notable religious centre, with dozens of Orthodox, Protestant and Catholic churches and orders. The town was also home to a large Jewish population.

Orsha was granted Magdeburg Rights in 1620. In 1630, Spiridon Sobol opened the first printing house at the Kuciejna monastery, which became a well-known centre of Cyrillic-alphabet publishing. The town was damaged during the Russo-Polish War (1654-1667), which was a disaster for the Grand Duchy of Lithuania. During the First Polish partition the city was taken over by the Russian Empire in 1772, and became part of the Mogilyov Gubernia. Under Russian rule, it was stripped of its Magdeburg Rights in 1776 and went into cultural and economic decline.  The population dropped sharply to just about 2,000 inhabitants. The city symbol in 1781 was changed to one which included the symbol of the Russian empire and five arrows.

In 1812, the city was badly burned during Napoleon's invasion. At the time of Orsha had been taken under control of French troops, there was a French writer Marie-Henri Beyle (also known under the pen name Stendhal) in a rank of intendant.
According to the census of 1897, on a total population of 13,161, about 7,000 are Jews.
During the First World War, the city was occupied by German forces in February–October 1918. From 2 February 1919, Orsha became a part of Homyel region (Vitebsk region, 1920) of Soviet Russia.  After the formation of the Soviet Union, it was transferred to the Byelorussian SSR in 1924.

The population before World War II was about 37,000. The city was occupied by Germany on 16 July 1941. The occupiers founded several concentration camps in the city, where an estimated 19,000 people were killed.

Orsha was one of the centers of the Belarusian strikes in April 1991. Hundreds of thousands of coal miners had been on strike across the Soviet Union since March 1. On April 3, the day after the central government had imposed consumer price increases, workers at several Minsk factories walked out raising the miners' demand for wages indexed to inflation. Virtually the entire labor force of that city followed on the 4th, joined soon thereafter by strikes across the Belarusian SSR. Mass demonstrations voted for additional demands (including the dissolution of the Union and Belarusian governments and the end of the Communist Party's privileges) and elected delegates from each enterprise to citywide strike committees, which in turn sent representatives to a central Belarusian Strike Committee (SKB). On April 23, the SKB resumed the general strike after the deadline for its demands to be met had passed. The next morning, Gorbachev, Yeltsin, and leaders of eight of the other Soviet republics published a joint declaration in the papers agreeing to democratic elections for the Soviet parliament and the presidency, a new union treaty that would "radically increase the role of the union republics," and measures to soften the impact of the price increase, but also the introduction of a "special work regime" in many industries.

In response, the Orsha strike committee issued a proposal for all local workers to block the railway junction, strategically located on the line linking Moscow and Leningrad to Eastern and Western Europe. This was quickly endorsed by votes to "lie down on the rails" at a citywide meeting at the railway station. On the 25th, the Belarusian authorities concentrated the republic's KGB and riot police forces on Orsha, but were resisted by the strikers who sent fuel trains primed to explode down the tracks. Gorbachev mobilized the nearby military forces in Pskov with instructions to restore order over the railway; however many officers declared their refusal to comply, and brigade commander Gennady Sidorov professed a "lack of understanding" of the mission. Meanwhile, workers in other cities throughout Belarus held rallies threatening to retaliate if a drop of blood was shed in Orsha.
Fearing a clash, and seizing on the government's offer to negotiate with its representatives and grant it radio and air time, the SKB suspended the general strike that evening.

Sports
The bandy club Start has produced players for the Belarus national bandy team.

Population change 
 16th-17th century: est. 5,000
 1776: less than 2,000
 1939: 37,000
 1970: 100,000
 2004: 125,000

Transportation 

Orsha became an important transportation center after the construction of a Dnieper River port. The coming of railway lines in the second half of the nineteenth century greatly contributed to the city growth:

 1871: Moscow–Minsk–Brest
 1902: Zhlobin–Mogilev–Vitebsk
 1923: Orsha-Krychaw
 1927: Orsha-Lepel

Today, Orsha is a major railway node where the Minsk–Moscow crosses the northern Vitebsk line, which branches south to Mogilev and Krychaw.  All trains from Moscow and Saint-Petersburg bound for Western Europe pass through Orsha.

The city is also a junction of the important motorways: The M1 (E30) Moscow-Brest and the M8/M20 (E95) Saint Petersburg - Odessa.

Military 
OSGOEINT reported on the 571st Aircraft Repair Plant (ARP) located at Orsha Airfield (Balbasovo Air Base). Accordingly, the 571st ARP repairs Mi-8-17 HIP, Mi-24-35 HIND, as well as the Tu-134 CRUSTY and possibly the IL-76 CANDID. The report goes on to mention recent investment agreements with Ukraine where private firms planned on providing $12 million to finance facility upgrades during the 2012-2016 period. Press reporting stated that the investors planned on building a modern warehouse terminal as well as office buildings for customs services, banking, and a leasing company.

Famous natives of Orsha

Francis Dzierozynski, Jesuit
 Piotra Holub (Golub Petr Semionovich) (1913–1953), artist, author of many well-known Soviet propaganda posters, such as "Болтун находка для шпиона" and many others
 Uladzimir Karatkievich, Belarusian writer
 Mikhail Marynich, opposition politician, who was imprisoned in Orsha 
 Georgy Mondzolevsky, 2-time Olympic volleyball champion
 Gershon Shufman, Hebrew author, known as 'Gimel Shufman'
 Frida Vigdorova, Soviet writer and journalist, famous for writing "White book" after Joseph Brodsky trial, in support of human rights in USSR (:ru:Вигдорова, Фрида Абрамовна)
 Lev Vygotsky, psychologist
 Nathan Zarkhi (1900–1935), Soviet playwright and film writer
 Faina Chiang, became first lady of the Republic of China in 1978.
 Igor Zhelezovsky, Olympic medalist speed skater
 Alina Talay (born 1989), track and field athlete
 Vyacheslav Zarenkov (born 1951), Belarusian entrepreneur
 Some legends state that the unknown father of Belarusian president Alexander Lukashenko was a peasant from Orsha.

Twin towns – sister cities

Orsha is twinned with:

 Asha, Russia
 Bălți, Moldova
 Bondeno, Italy
 Cherkasy, Ukraine
 Dubna, Russia
 Gagarin, Russia
 Ivanovo, Russia
 Ivanteyevka, Russia
 Kardymovsky District, Russia
 Koptevo (Moscow), Russia
 Krasnogvardeysky (Saint Petersburg), Russia
 Mārupe, Latvia

 Pernik, Bulgaria
 Pushkin, Russia
 Qingdao, China
 Shishou, China
 Silifke, Turkey
 Smolensk, Russia
 Spitak, Armenia
 Telšiai, Lithuania
 Tver, Russia
 Vaulx-en-Velin, France
 Volgodonsk, Russia
 Vyazma, Russia
 Yiwu, China
 Zapadnoye Degunino (Moscow), Russia

References

External links 

 RUPE "Machine-tool plant "Krasny borets"
 Orsha - city
 Photos on Radzima.org
 Map of Orsha
 Memories from a childhood in Orsha
 Jewish Encyclopedia
 Орша - город мой! Orsha is my city
 Travel Guide to Orsha
 Belarus tries to raise restive Orsha from the ashes Belarus Digest
 

 
Populated places in Vitebsk Region
Orsha District
Orshansky Uyezd
Vitebsk Voivodeship
Shtetls
Cities in Belarus
Polochans
Populated places established in the 11th century
Holocaust locations in Belarus
Populated places on the Dnieper in Belarus